Hua Mat Railway Halt is a railway halt located in Thung Luang Subdistrict, Lamae District, Chumphon.

Services 
 Local No. 445/446 Chumphon-Hat Yai Junction-Chumphon

References 
 
 

Railway stations in Thailand
Chumphon province